Boris Pertel (born 21 April 1888, date of death unknown) was a Russian Empire sports shooter. He competed in the men's trap event at the 1912 Summer Olympics.

References

External links
 

1888 births
Year of death missing
Male sport shooters from the Russian Empire
Shooters at the 1912 Summer Olympics
Sportspeople from Saint Petersburg